The Federal Correctional Complex, Terre Haute (FCC Terre Haute) is a United States federal prison complex for male inmates in Indiana; much of the complex grounds is in Terre Haute, though portions are in unincorporated Vigo County. It is operated by the Federal Bureau of Prisons, a division of the United States Department of Justice, and consists of two facilities:

Federal Correctional Institution, Terre Haute (FCI Terre Haute): Established in 1960, it is a medium-security facility with a Communication Management Unit which holds inmates who are deemed to require increased monitoring of communications with others.
United States Penitentiary, Terre Haute (USP Terre Haute): Established in 1940, it is a high-security facility which holds federal death row for men and also has a prison camp for minimum-security male offenders.

SCU 
United States Penitentiary, Terre Haute uses a Special Confinement Unit to separate Federal death sentenced inmates. Male inmates are transferred from other facilities, like state and federal prisons, for engagement in the Special Confinement Unit. USP Terre Haute opened the SCU on July 13, 1999.

Segregated housing 
Inmates considered high risk are immediately placed in a secure wing with more rules and supervision. These prisons are restricted segregation, which involves a twenty-three hour cell lock in, usually in solitary confinement. Inmates are allowed a thirty minute lunch and thirty minutes of yard time.

History

Gonorrhea experiments

The Terre Haute prison experiments in 1943 and 1944 were the precursor to the Syphilis experiments in Guatemala.

In 1942, the sixth Surgeon General of the United States, Thomas Parran, Jr., endorsed medical experiments on STD transmission so long as volunteers were found to be exposed to infection.

In 1943, a decision was made to use prisoners as volunteers, as soldiers could not be guaranteed sexual abstinence for six months, and the mentally ill were not considered appropriate research subjects. Due to legal issues, the Army Medical Corps preferred federal prisons to state run institutions, and Terre Haute had the best medical facilities. Prisoners participated with consent, receiving $100 for their involvement. A 2011 US Bioethics report states:

The infection methods used by doctors did not involve natural sexual intercourse, unlike in 1947 in the Syphilis experiments in Guatemala. Dr. John Charles Cutler supported the experiment to his death.

Deaths
On September 15, 2010, prisoner Daniel L. Delaney (09416-112) murdered his cellmate while both were in the Special Housing Unit (SHU) or solitary confinement. Delaney was convicted of first degree murder for the act. He was transferred to ADX Florence.

See also

List of U.S. federal prisons
Incarceration in the United States

References

External links
FCC Terre Haute Official website

Federal Correctional Complexes in the United States
Prisons in Indiana
Buildings and structures in Terre Haute, Indiana
Execution sites in the United States
1940 establishments in Indiana
Buildings and structures completed in 1940